In a restaurant an order wheel is a piece of equipment used to track customer orders. It is used to facilitate a process whereby a new order is clipped onto a wheel which is then turned clockwise from the server or "waitress" side of the restaurant around to the kitchen or "cook" side. Orders are made in sequence and turned further back around to the server as completed.

This process has continued into the electronic age where the mechanical wheel is no longer a physical device, but an order is still sent to the kitchen and then returned to the server once completed via a sequential process of first in - first out.

When certain orders take longer to cook, (i.e. well done steak) the "ticket" can be pulled from the wheel and re-inserted when completed.

The term "working the wheel" is a reference to the cook responsible for coordinating what to start cooking first and timing all food finishing at the same time.

Restaurant terminology

A related excerpt from a book:

     “At the end of World War II, soldiers were returning from the front lines and reentering the workforce. In the process, they were displacing the women who had stepped up and filled many positions in their absence. Many women chose to remain in the workforce, which created animosity between the sexes in the workplace but also gave rise to a new view of the role women could play in the American economy. 
     
     Restaurants around the country were facing a particular struggle. The returning soldiers were granted positions as cooks. The women who had held those positions were demoted to waitresses, positions of lower pay. The result: an antagonistic relationship between cooks and waitresses in an environment in which cooperation is a necessity. Everybody suffered, including the patrons, who often received late or wrong orders. Employees were quitting and restaurants were losing customers. 

     So the National Restaurant Association enlisted the help of William Foote Whyte, a professor at the University of Chicago, to solve the problem. He observed the activity in a sample of restaurants, watching as cooks and waitresses slung insults, ignored each other, and behaved vindictively (at the expense of the customer). 

     “While many consultants might have been tempted to alter this unhealthy social climate by teaching interpersonal skills, conducting team-building exercises, or changing the pay system, Whyte took a different approach,” explained the authors. “In his view, the best way to solve the problem was to change the way employees communicated.” 4 

     Working with a pilot restaurant, Whyte recommended they use a simple metal spindle to place orders with the kitchen. The waitresses would put the orders on the spindle and the cooks would fulfill the orders in whatever way was most efficient, but making sure that those that were placed first were prioritized. 

     The results were immediate: decreased conflict, decreased customer complaints, and communication and behavior that were more respectful on both sides.”

— How to Win Friends and Influence People in the Digital Age by Dale Carnegie,  Associates
https://a.co/e6IlcZQ